Tillandsia caput-medusae is a species of flowering plant in the bromeliad family, Bromeliaceae, subfamily Tillandsioideae. Common names include octopus plant and medusa's head. An epiphyte native to Central America and Mexico, T. caput-medusae is a commonly cultivated bromeliad species. The rosette of leaves arise from an inflated pseudobulb. Pups are produced after blooming, as is usual with most Tillandsia species.

In a greenhouse, the plants can bloom from spring to early summer. The red inflorescences are usually unbranched or digitate.

Tillandsia caput-medusae does not have any free water retention in its overlapping leaves because its abaxial and adaxial leaf bases provides trichomes which coats the leaves. The significance of trichome is to enhance leaf permeability.

Cultivars
Tillandsia 'Bruce Aldridge' (T. caput-medusae × T. schiedeana)
Tillandsia 'Calum' (T. caput-medusae × T. brachycaulos)
Tillandsia 'Canina' (T. bulbosa × T. caput-medusae)
Tillandsia 'Cheryl' (T. caput-medusae × T. capitata 'Peach')
Tillandsia 'Como' (T. streptophylla × T. caput-medusae)
Tillandsia 'Gunalda' (T. concolor × T. caput-medusae)
Tillandsia 'Imbil' (T. brachycaulos × T. caput-medusae)
Tillandsia 'June Bug' (T. caput-medusae × T. bulbosa)
Tillandsia 'Litl Liz' (T. caput-medusae × T. streptophylla)
Tillandsia 'Panuco' (T. caput-medusae × T. durangensis)
Tillandsia 'Pomona' (T. caput-medusae × T. ionantha)
Tillandsia 'Red Slippers' (T. ionantha var. van-hyningii × T. caput-medusae 'Red form')
Tillandsia 'Sonoran Snow'
Tillandsia 'Veronica Orozco' (T. baileyi × T. caput-medusae)
Tillandsia 'Vicente Bacaya' (T. capitata × T. caput-medusae)

References

caput-medusae
Plants described in 1880
Flora of Central America
Flora of Mexico